The year 1918 in science and technology involved some significant events, listed below.

Astronomy
 June 8 – Nova Aquila, the brightest observed since 1604, is discovered.
 Kiyotsugu Hirayama identifies several groups of main belt asteroids, now known as Hirayama families.
 Harlow Shapley demonstrates that globular clusters are arranged in a spheroid or halo whose center is not the Earth, but the center of the galaxy.
 Heber Curtis discovers a relativistic jet of matter emerging from Elliptical galaxy M87.

Biology
 February 21 – The last known Carolina parakeet (the only parrot species native to the eastern United States) dies in Cincinnati Zoo.
 Around 1000 pilot whales strand in the Chatham Islands.
 R. A. Fisher puts forward a genetic model that shows that continuous variation could be the result of Mendelian inheritance in his paper "The Correlation Between Relatives on the Supposition of Mendelian Inheritance".
 J. Henri Fabre's The Sacred Beetle, and others published in English.
 Jacques Loeb's Forced Movements, Tropisms, and Animal Conduct published in the United States.

Cryptography
 February 23 – Arthur Scherbius applies to patent the Enigma machine.
 Edward Hugh Hebern patents the Hebern rotor machine.

History of science
 Technisches Museum Wien opens in Vienna.

Mathematics
 Felix Hausdorff introduces the concept of the fractional Hausdorff dimension.
 Gaston Julia describes the iteration of a rational function.

Physics
 July 26 – Emmy Noether introduces what becomes known as Noether's theorem, from which conservation laws are deduced for symmetries of angular momentum, linear momentum and energy, at Göttingen, Germany.
 Josef Lense and Hans Thirring find the gravitomagnetic precession of gyroscopes in the equations of general relativity.
 Hans Reissner and Gunnar Nordström solve the Einstein and Maxwell field equations for charged spherically-symmetric non-rotating systems.
 Friedrich Kottler gets a Schwarzschild solution without Einstein vacuum field equations.

Physiology and medicine
 January – 1918 flu pandemic: "Spanish 'flu" (influenza) first observed in Haskell County, Kansas.
 March 26 – Dr. Marie Stopes publishes her influential book Married Love in the U.K., following it with Wise Parenthood, a treatise on birth control.
 June–August – "Spanish 'flu" becomes pandemic.
 September 7 – J. B. Christopherson publishes his discovery that antimony potassium tartrate is an effective cure for bilharzia.
 Hartog Jacob Hamburger describes the chloride shift.

Technology
 April 10 – Alexander M. Nicholson files a United States patent for the radio crystal oscillator.
 July – American cinematographer Frank D. Williams is granted a patent for the "Williams process" of travelling matte.
 Edwin Howard Armstrong develops the superheterodyne receiver.
 George Constantinescu publishes Theory of sonics: a treatise on transmission of power by vibrations, originating the study of this branch of continuum mechanics.
 Theodore von Karman and Asbóth Oszkár build the first co-axial helicopter.
 Charles Strite invents the pop-up toaster.

Awards
 Nobel Prize
 Physics – Max Karl Ernst Ludwig Planck
 Chemistry – Fritz Haber
 Medicine – not awarded

Births
 January 23 – Gertrude B. Elion (died 1999), American pharmacologist, Nobel laureate.
 January 27 – Antonín Mrkos (died 1996), Czech astronomer.
 March 13  – Marjorie Blamey (died 2019), English botanical illustrator.
 March 16 – Frederick Reines (died 1998), American physicist, Nobel laureate.
 April 4 – Joseph Ashbrook (died 1980), American astronomer.
 April 25 – Gérard de Vaucouleurs (died 1995), French astronomer.
 May 11 – Richard Feynman (died 1988), American physicist, Nobel laureate.
 May 20 – Alexandra Illmer Forsythe (died 1980), American computer scientist
 June 6 – Edwin G. Krebs (died 2009), American biochemist, Nobel laureate.
 July 15
 Bertram Brockhouse (died 2003), Canadian physicist.
 Brenda Milner, English-born neuropsychologist.
 July 16 – Samuel Victor Perry (died 2009), English biochemist, pioneer in the field of muscle biochemistry.
 August 3 – Cheng Kaijia (died 2018), Chinese nuclear physicist.
 August 13 – Frederick Sanger (died 2013), English molecular biologist, double Nobel laureate.
 August 26 – Katherine Johnson (died 2020), African American mathematician and space physicist.
 August 29 – John Herivel (died 2011), British cryptanalyst and science historian.
 September 8 – Derek Barton (died 1998), English-born organic chemist, Nobel laureate. 
 September 27 – Martin Ryle (died 1984), English radio astronomer.
 October 4 – Adrian Kantrowitz (died 2008), American cardiac surgeon.
 November 10 – Ernst Otto Fischer (died 2007), German chemist, Nobel laureate.
 November 19 – Hendrik C. van de Hulst (died 2000), Dutch astronomer.
 December 25 – Tamara Mikhaylovna Smirnova (died 2001), Russian astronomer.
 Eleanor C. Pressly (died 2003), American mathematician and aeronautical engineer.

Deaths
 January 6 – Georg Cantor (born 1845), German mathematician.
 January 26 – Ewald Hering (born 1834), German physiologist.
 January 31 – Ivan Puluj (born 1845), Austrian-born Ukrainian physicist.
 April 20 – Karl Ferdinand Braun (born 1850), German physicist, Nobel laureate.
 May 1 – G. K. Gilbert (born 1843), American geologist.
 May 31 – Alexander Mitscherlich (born 1836), German chemist.
 June 13 – Samuel Jean de Pozzi (born 1846), French gynaecologist.
 June 27 – George Mary Searle (born 1839), American astronomer.
 June 29 – Alfred Senier (born 1853), Irish chemist.
 September 7 – Peter Ludwig Mejdell Sylow (born 1832), Norwegian mathematician.
 August 22 – Korbinian Brodmann (born 1868), German neurologist.
 October 28 – Ulisse Dini (born 1845), Italian mathematician.
 November 3 – Aleksandr Lyapunov (born 1857), Russian mathematician and physicist.
 November 29 – Thomas Allinson (born 1858), English physician and dietetic reformer.
 December 26 – William Hampton Patton (born 1853), American entomologist.
 December 27 – Birt Acres (born 1854), American-born English pioneer of cinematography.

References

 
20th century in science
1910s in science